The 1996 United States Senate election in Minnesota was held on November 5, 1996. Incumbent Democrat Paul Wellstone won reelection to a second term defeating former Republican Senator Rudy Boschwitz in a rematch.

Primary elections 
The primary election was held on September 10, 1996.

DFL

Republican

General election

Major candidates
 Dean Barkley (Reform), attorney
 Rudy Boschwitz (Republican), former U.S. Senator
 Paul Wellstone (Democratic), incumbent U.S. Senator

Campaign
Wellstone had unseated the two-term senator Boschwitz in the 1990 election. Boschwitz filed for a rematch. He released ads calling Wellstone "embarrassingly liberal" and "Senator Welfare", and accused Wellstone of supporting flag burning, a move some believe backfired. As in 1990, Wellstone had a massive grassroots campaign that inspired college students, poor people and minorities to get involved in politics for the first time. Boschwitz significantly outspent Wellstone on campaign advertising and the race was closely contested, but Wellstone defeated Boschwitz by a nine-point margin in a three-way race. Dean Barkley received 7% of the vote and was appointed by Governor Jesse Ventura to serve the last few months of Wellstone's term after Wellstone died in a plane crash 11 days before the 2002 election.

Results

See also 
 1996 United States Senate elections

References 

1996 Minnesota elections
Minnesota
1996